The Mortal Sin is a lost 1917 silent film drama directed by John H. Collins and distributed by Metro Pictures. Viola Dana, at the time Collins's wife, stars in the picture.

Cast
Viola Dana - Jane Anderson
Robert Walker - George Anderson
Augustus Phillips - Emmet Standish
Lady Thompson - Flora
Henry Leone - Jean Rambeau
Louis B. Foley - The Doctor
Ricca Allen - Landlady

References

External links

1917 films
American silent feature films
Lost American films
1917 drama films
Silent American drama films
American black-and-white films
Metro Pictures films
1917 lost films
Lost drama films
1910s American films